Pacifico Bizza (born in 1695 in Arbe) was a Croatian clergyman and bishop for the Roman Catholic Archdiocese of Split-Makarska. He was appointed bishop in 1738. He died in 1756.

References 

1695 births
1756 deaths
Croatian Roman Catholic bishops
Bishops of Split